Nigeria competed in the 2008 Summer Olympics which were held in Beijing, People's Republic of China from August 8 to August 24, 2008.

Medalists

Athletics

Fourteen men and eighteen women qualified to represent Nigeria in athletics.

Key
 Note – Ranks given for track events are within the athlete's heat only
 Q = Qualified for the next round
 q = Qualified for the next round as a fastest loser or, in field events, by position without achieving the qualifying target
 NR = National record
 N/A = Round not applicable for the event
 Bye = Athlete not required to compete in round

Men
Track & road events

Women
Track & road events

* Competed in the heats only

Field events

Badminton

Boxing

Nigeria qualified four boxers for the Olympic boxing tournament. All four qualified at the second African continental qualifying tournament.

Football

Men's tournament

Roster

Group play

Quarterfinals

Semi-finals

Gold medal game

Final rank

Women's tournament

Roster

Group play

Judo 

Vivian Yusuf represented Nigeria in Judo.

Swimming

Men

Women

Table tennis 

Singles

Team

Taekwondo

Muhammad Isah Adam and Chika Chukwumerije represented Nigeria in Taekwondo.

Weightlifting

Wrestling 

Key
  - Victory by Fall.
  - Decision by Points - the loser with technical points.
  - Decision by Points - the loser without technical points.

Men's freestyle

Women's freestyle

See also
 Nigeria at the 2006 Commonwealth Games
 Nigeria at the 2008 Summer Paralympics
 Nigeria at the 2010 Commonwealth Games

References

Nations at the 2008 Summer Olympics
2008
Olympics